Modius may refer to:

 an ancient Roman unit for dry measures, (8.73 L) roughly equivalent to a peck
 a medieval Roman unit for area, approximately 40 acres
 Modius (headdress), a type of cylindrical headdress so called for its resemblance to the measure of grain
 Modius, the family name of the Modia (gens)

See also

 
 Modi (disambiguation)
 Modia (disambiguation)
 Modis (disambiguation)